"Back to the Klondike" is a Disney comic book story created by Carl Barks, created in September 1952  and first published in March 1953 in Four Color #456. Scrooge McDuck returns to Klondike where he has made his fortune, bringing Donald and the three nephews along, to find back the gold he has left there. 

This story is a turning point in Barks' depiction of Scrooge: the first to show that the character has a softer side, and his miserly gruffness is partly a mask that he uses to guard against loneliness and loss.

Plot

At the beginning of the story, Scrooge McDuck seems to be suffering from memory lapses to the point he cannot even recognize Donald. Donald drags him to a doctor and Scrooge is given some pills supposed to help recover his memory. As his memory returns, Scrooge suddenly starts planning to return to the Klondike, Yukon, the place of his youth where he earned his wealth. He tells Donald and his nephews, who accompany him, he has left a cargo of gold buried near his old hut. Scrooge also begins to make references to "Glittering Goldie", a person of his past. 

As Scrooge seems to relive his past, but feeling his age, they arrive in Dawson, where Scrooge explains how he and Goldie met. Scrooge tells his nephews how Goldie stole his gold from him in the past, and how he kidnapped her and forced Goldie to work for him at his mining claim, up until the point where we see -in a flashback scène- Goldie shouting at Scrooge while crying for her ruined dress. 

The journey continues till they reach his old lodge and to their surprise it's occupied. Also, the current occupant forcibly resists any of their attempts to approach. Finally the nephews manage to surprise and disarm the old lady behind the attack, Goldie herself. As Scrooge and Goldie meet again, both a rivalry and an attraction to each other seem to resurface. But Scrooge demands an old debt that Goldie cannot pay. She gives her last jewelry to Scrooge and just leaves, apparently quitting. But Scrooge calls her back and challenges her to a contest. A contest of who can find gold first. 

Goldie succeeds in finding Scrooge's old cache that is now worth a fortune. After more than fifty years she succeeded. Scrooge leaves seemingly defeated and pretending that because he hadn't taken his pills, he had forgotten where the gold was. But behind his back, Donald reveals to his nephews that Scrooge had indeed taken the pills and practically offered this gold to Goldie. In the end, his nephews realize that Scrooge is more emotional than he would like to appear.

Writing
Barks wrote the story after his second divorce, when he was traveling and living out of motels. In a Seattle bookshop, he found a copy of Klondike '98 by Ethel Anderson Becker, a book of photographs of the Klondike gold rush. He later wrote, "Reading this is how I got off on this wild beat of having Scrooge have the big fight in the saloon, kidnap this gal, and take her out to the hills and make her work out her debt."

Publication history
In its first printing, the story was cut from 32 to 27 pages, since the editors did not believe the bar fight and abduction scenes were appropriate for a Disney comic. Barks later recalled, "I think they figured I should have had sense enough to know you couldn't get involved in fights in a barroom. It was quite a while afterwards before I found out why they cut it. I got a letter from the office, or was told on my next visit to the office, that I had violated a lot of their taboos and should have had sense enough to know it wouldn't work." Another of Western's concerns was that Scrooge kidnapped Goldie and made her work on his claim for a month, and that sequence was also cut from the published story.

Later, all cut art, except for a half page, was recovered and the story was published in its entirety in 1981 with the missing half page reconstructed by Barks.

Analysis
Barks had an interest in Klondike and scenes of this story were inspired by old Klondike tales, but this story can be seen as most important for its contribution to the development of Scrooge's personality, and way of thought. Scrooge's participation in the Klondike Gold Rush had been mentioned before, but this is the first time the Klondike becomes an essential part of Scrooge's past. In later stories by both Barks and his "successors", references to Scrooge's past in the Klondike appear even more often than those to his native Scotland. 

The story presents the first appearance of Goldie O'Gilt (Glittering Goldie). Her love/hate relationship with Scrooge is considered by some people, mainly Don Rosa fans, a great part of the two characters' appeal. The story is, according to these fans, the first focusing on Scrooge's love life, and the last focusing on it by Barks. 

Another theme introduced in this story is that Scrooge makes conscious effort to hide or deny his own feelings and emotions because he doesn't want to appear vulnerable. This has become an essential part of the character's way of thinking and acting in subsequent stories. Often mentioned as one of Barks' strongest stories, it largely defines Scrooge's character, and the themes introduced here are now considered part of a tradition.

However, part of the story has been controversial, as Western Publishing censored a section because of its rough atmosphere. It was considered inappropriate for a comic read by children. Despite this, the censored segment has made it into more recent publications.

DuckTales version

This was later adapted into an episode of the first season of DuckTales, with some alterations. Donald was removed; Webby and Mrs. Beakley were added; Scrooge suffers no memory lapses, as in the comic. He returns to Klondike because he suddenly remembers Goldie after seeing Beakly and Webby making Valentine's Day cards. Two villains are added that were not in Barks' story. Scrooge and Goldie are open about their romantic interest in one another, not only privately, but in front of Scrooge's nephews. The episode also introduces the Red Agony Creek which was never mentioned in Barks story (or by any other author - such as Rosa), making this land unique to the television series.

See also
List of Disney comics by Carl Barks

References

External links

Back to the Klondike in Carl Barks guidebook

Disney comics stories
Donald Duck comics by Carl Barks
Scrooge McDuck
1952 in comics
Klondike Gold Rush in fiction
simple:DuckTales#Back to the Klondike